J. Lawrence Smith may refer to:
 J. Lawrence Smith (chemist), American chemist and mineralogist
 J. Lawrence Smith (New York politician), American lawyer, politician, and judge

See also
 Lawrence Smith (disambiguation)
 John Smith (disambiguation)